Ibuki may refer to:

Places
 Mount Ibuki, Japan
 Ibuki, Shiga, a former town in Japan

Fictional Characters
 Ibuki (Azur Lane), a Moe anthropomorphism of the Japanese cruiser Ibuki (1943)  from the video game series Azur Lane 
 Ibuki (Street Fighter), from the video game series Street Fighter
 Kamen Rider Ibuki, a fictional character from the Japanese television series Kamen Rider Hibiki
 Ibuki (Yakuza)
 Ibuki Mioda, a fictional character from Danganronpa 2: Goodbye Despair , second game in the Danganronpa series
 Ibuki (Xenoblade Chronicles 2), a rare blade from Xenoblade Chronicles 2, third game in the Xenoblade Series
 Suika Ibuki, from the Touhou Project video game series
 Ibuki or Clair (Pokémon), a Johto gym leader from the Pokémon series

Ships
 , several ships

Other uses
 Ibuki (name), a Japanese surname and given name
 Ibuki (Kodō album), 1996
 Ibuki (Yoshida Brothers album), 1999
 Ibuki (satellite), the world's first greenhouse-gas-monitoring satellite